Andres Luure (born 22 May 1959, in Tallinn) is an Estonian philosopher and translator, and a researcher at Tallinn University.

Luure graduated from the Moscow State University in 1983, majoring in mathematics. In 1998, he successfully defended his MA thesis titled "A combinatorial model of referring".  In 2006, he successfully defended his Ph. D. thesis titled "Duality and sextets: a new structure of categories" in semiotics at the University of Tartu.

Luure has translated philosophical works into Estonian, including titles by Ludwig Wittgenstein, Jürgen Habermas and Gilbert Ryle.

Recognition 
In 2008, Luure was recognised by Estonian Volunteering Development Centre as the Volunteer of the Year for his contribution to the Estonian Wikipedia. He received the Order of the White Star, 5th Class in 2013 for his contribution to the Estonian Wikipedia.

References

1959 births
Living people
University of Tartu alumni
Estonian philosophers
Estonian mathematicians
Estonian translators
Estonian semioticians
Academic staff of Tallinn University
Recipients of the Order of the White Star, 5th Class
People from Tallinn